The 2003 NCAA Division I women's basketball tournament began on March 22, 2003, and concluded on April 8, 2003, when the Connecticut Huskies (UConn) won their second straight national title. The Final Four was held at the Georgia Dome in Atlanta, Georgia on April 6–8, 2003. UConn, coached by Geno Auriemma, defeated archrival Tennessee, coached by Pat Summitt, 73–68 in the championship game. UConn's Diana Taurasi was named Most Outstanding Player.

This was the first year of a new format, in which the final game is held on the Tuesday following the men's championship, in contrast to prior years, when it was held on Sunday evening, between the men's semi-final and final. The game now is the final game of the Division 1 collegiate basketball season.

Tournament records
 Rebounds – Connecticut recorded 22 rebounds in the Championship game against Tennessee, setting the record for fewest rebounds in an NCAA tournament Championship game.
 Free throws – Villanova attempted zero free throws in the Mideast Regional final game against Tennessee, one of only two times a team has attempted zero free throws in an NCAA Regional game
 Three-point field goals made – Diana Taurasi made 20 three-point field goals, tying the record for most three-point field goals in an NCAA tournament
 Free throws – Tennessee completed 128 free throws, setting the record for made free throws in an NCAA tournament

Qualifying teams – automatic
Sixty-four teams were selected to participate in the 2003 NCAA Tournament. Thirty-one conferences were eligible for an automatic bid to the 2003 NCAA tournament.

Qualifying teams – at-large
Thirty-three additional teams were selected to complete the sixty-four invitations.

Bids by conference
Thirty-one conferences earned an automatic bid. In twenty-two cases, the automatic bid was the only representative from the conference. Thirty-three additional at-large teams were selected from nine of the conferences.

First and second rounds

In 2003, the field remained at 64 teams. The teams were seeded, and assigned to four geographic regions, with seeds 1–16 in each region. In Round 1, seeds 1 and 16 faced each other, as well as seeds 2 and 15, seeds 3 and 14, seeds 4 and 13, seeds 5 and 12, seeds 6 and 11, seeds 7 and 10, and seeds 8 and 9. In 2003, a change was implemented in the way first and second round sites were determined. From 1982 (the year of the first NCAA women's basketball tournament) through 2002, the first rounds sites were offered to the top seeds. Starting in 2003, sixteen sites for the first two rounds were determined approximately a year before the team selections and seedings were completed.

The following table lists the region, host school, venue and the sixteen first and second round locations:

Regionals and Final Four

The Regionals, named for the general location, were held from March 22 to March 25 at these sites:

 East Regional  University of Dayton Arena, Dayton, Ohio (Host: University of Dayton)
 Mideast Regional  Thompson-Boling Arena, Knoxville, Tennessee (Host: University of Tennessee)
 Midwest Regional  The Pit (arena), Albuquerque, New Mexico (Host: University of New Mexico)
 West Regional  Maples Pavilion, Stanford, California (Host: Stanford University)

Each regional winner advanced to the Final Four held April 6 and April 8 in Atlanta, Georgia at the Georgia Dome, (Host: Georgia Institute of Technology)

Bids by state
The sixty-four teams came from thirty-two states, plus Washington, D.C. Virginia had the most teams with five bids. Eighteen states did not have any teams receiving bids.

Brackets
Data Source

Mideast Region – Knoxville, Tennessee

Midwest Region – Albuquerque, New Mexico

East Region – Dayton, Ohio

West Region – Stanford, California

Final Four – Atlanta, Georgia

E-East; ME-Mideast; MW-Midwest; W-West.

Record by conference

Nineteen conferences went 0–1: America East, Atlantic Sun Conference, Big Sky Conference, Big South Conference, Colonial, Ivy League, MAAC, MAC, Mid-Continent, MEAC, Missouri Valley Conference, Northeast Conference, Ohio Valley Conference, Patriot League, Southern Conference, Southland, SWAC, Sun Belt Conference, and West Coast Conference

All-Tournament team
 Diana Taurasi, Connecticut
 Ann Strother, Connecticut
 Alana Beard, Duke
 Gwen Jackson, Tennessee
 Kara Lawson, Tennessee

Game officials
 Scott Yarbrough (semifinal)
 Joe Cunningham (semifinal)
 June Courteau (semifinal)
 Sally Bell (semifinal)
 Dee Kantner (semifinal)
 Eric Larson (semifinal)
 Wesley Dean (final)
 Melissa Barlow (final)
 Lisa Mattingly (final)

See also
 NCAA Women's Division I Basketball Championship
 2003 NCAA Division I men's basketball tournament
 2003 NAIA Division I men's basketball tournament

Notes

NCAA Division I women's basketball tournament
Tournament
NCAA Division I women's basketball tournament
NCAA Division I women's basketball tournament
Basketball competitions in Lubbock, Texas
Basketball competitions in Atlanta
Women's sports in Georgia (U.S. state)
College sports tournaments in Georgia (U.S. state)